Karuvari Pookkal (Tamil: Karuvarai Pookkal) is a 2011 Tamil film based on the story of Gopi's transition from a man to a woman. It was written and directed by IPS Xavier, with music direction by Thomas Rathnam. The film features Smile Vidya and Julia Robert in the role of Gopi/Gopika, a transgender person, and Pallavi as the widowed mother, with Aswatha as sister and Haris as brother playing supporting roles.

Plot

Karuvarai Pookkal is the first Tamil film about transgender people . It illustrates the difficult life and folklore of transgender people in India, especially in Tamil Nadu. It portrays the critical situation of the family after a transgender child is born. It also discusses the difficulties and taboos of bringing up the child, and delves into the difficulties that the child faces itself. 

Julia Robert (alias Robert), a real transgender person, plays the part of Gopi, a transgender person from childhood to adulthood. Smile Vidya (also known as Saravana, another real transgender person) takes the part of Gopi after undergoing gender reassignment surgery and being renamed as Gopika. Many of the roles are played by real transgender people from all over India.

Music for the film was composed by Thomas Rathnam (Isai Aruvi Thomas Rathnam), an upcoming music composer from India. He has composed music for Tamil, English, Kannada, and Hindi films, television serials, and documentaries.

Cast
 Smile Vidya as Gopika, an adult transgender person
 Julia Robert as Gopi, a transgender child
 Pallavi as mother
 Haris as brother
 Aswatha as sister
 Various transgender people playing transgender people

Production and development
The film was produced by Nivedhitha International. Difficulties were encountered in finding transgender actors.

Soundtrack
The film's soundtrack, composed by Thomas Rathnam, was released on 16 May 2010. It coincided with a promotional event held at the Convention Centre in Puducherry, while the lyrics for all the songs were written by Ka.Chezhian, IPS Xavier, and Priyan.

Release and reception
Karuvarai Pookkal was released on 4 February 2011 and has received widespread critical acclaim in India.

References

External links
 

2011 films
LGBT-related drama films
2011 LGBT-related films
2010s Tamil-language films
Docufiction films
Transgender in Asia
Transgender-related films
Indian LGBT-related films
2011 drama films